Onutė Narbutaitė (born 12 June 1956, Vilnius) is a Lithuanian composer.

Life and work 
Born in Vilnius, in the family of musicologist Ona Narbutienė and geologist Vytautas Narbutas, Onutė Narbutaitė learned the basics of composition from Bronius Kutavičius at M.K.Čiurlionis School of Art, graduating in 1979 from the Lithuanian State Conservatory (now the Lithuanian Academy of Music and Theatre) where she studied composition under Julius Juzeliūnas. From 1979 to 1982 she taught music theory and history at the Klaipėda Faculty of the Lithuanian State Conservatory. Since then she has been working as a freelance composer in Vilnius. Her works have been performed at various concerts and music festivals in the many European countries, USA, Canada, South Korea.

Narbutaitė develops a very personal musical language with characteristic features such as intellectualism and solid structuring, expressive instrumentation and suggestive melodic writing, multilayered vertical stacking and an intense musical flow. Her aural imagery correlates with a great number of cultural reminiscences in her music.

She has received commissions from the Helsinki Festival, the Schleswig-Holstein Musik Festival, the Bavarian Radio's musica viva series, the 50th Warsaw Autumn, the festivals Klangspuren Schwaz, Velvet Curtain (Krakow – European Capital of Culture 2000 project), Kaustinen XX Chamber Music Week (festival's guest composer),  Europäisches Musikfest Münsterland, ISCM World Music Days / Gaida 2008, as well as the Louth Contemporary Music Society, the Lithuanian National Opera and Ballet Theatre, the Frankfurt Brandenburg State Orchestra, the Seattle Chamber Players, the Ostrobothnian Chamber Orchestra, the Kronos Quartet (Fifty for the Future project), among others.

Narbutaitė’s music has been performed by the Lithuanian National Symphony Orchestra, the Bavarian Radio Symphony Orchestra, Sinfonia Varsovia, the BBC Symphony Orchestra, the City of Birmingham Symphony Orchestra, the Polish National Radio Symphony Orchestra, the Basel Sinfonietta, the Tapiola Sinfonietta, the Munich Chamber Orchestra, Sinfonietta Rīga, Ensemble Resonanz, Silesian String Quartet, Arditti Quartet and many others.

Her music, as the featured guest composer, has been more widely presented at some festivals and other events in Germany, Poland, Finland, including Aboa musica festival (Turku, 2003) whose entire program was dedicated to the music of two composers - Einojuhani Rautavaara and Onutė Narbutaitė (among other works, Symphony No.2 was performed by the Turku Philharmonic Orchestra).

In 2002-2003 Finlandia Records released a set of four CD’s of Onutė Narbutaitė works. Among international recognized recordings of her works is also the 2011  Naxos CD of Tres Dei Matris Symphoniae, as well as 2017 Naxos symphonic music CD no yesterday, no tomorrow.

At the International Rostrum of Composers, organised by UNESCO’s International Music Council and radio broadcasters on all five continents, to the top ten list of best compositions were chosen her orchestral compositions Melody in the Garden of Olives (Paris, 2004), riverbank-river-symphony (Lisbon, 2010), Was There a Butterfly? (Palermo, 2017).

Awards 
In the competitions of the best works of the year organised by the Lithuanian Composers’ Union as the best works were recognized orchestral compositions Symphony Nr.2 (2001), Tres Dei Matris Symphoniae (2004), La barca (2005), choral project Lapides, flores, nomina et sidera (2008), opera Cornet, composition for chamber orchestra Was there a Butterfly? (Composer of the Year, 2014), chamber work Labyrinth (2018).

In 1997 Narbutaitė received the Lithuanian National Prize for the oratorio Centones meae urbi.

Onutė Narbutaitė is also the recipient of the Lithuanian Association of Art Creators prize (2005), the St Christopher statue awarded by the Vilnius City Municipality (2008), the Golden Cross of the Stage for opera Cornet (most important lithuanian award to the creators of theatre, 2014), the Gold Star awarded by the Lithuanian Copyright Protection Association (2015), as well as of other prizes.

Works

Vokal-Orchestral 
Centones meae urbi, oratorio for soprano, bass-baritone, choir and orchestra (1997, texts by Czesław Miłosz, Moshe Kulbak, Adam Mickiewicz, Mathias Casimirus Sarbievius, Eugenijus Ališanka, Jeremiah's lamentation etc.)

Tres Dei Matris Symphoniae, for choir and orchestra (symphony no. 3, 2003, texts from the Song of Songs, Angelus Domini, Gloria, Stabat Mater, Hildegard von Bingen, lat)

Cornet (Kornetas), opera for 9 soloists, choir and orchestra (2012, libretto by O.Narbutaitė, based on texts by Rainer Maria Rilke and other authors)

kein gestern, kein morgen, for mezzo-soprano, tenor and orchestra (concert version of a fragment from act II of the opera Cornet, 2012/2015, texts by Rainer Maria Rilke, Oscar Milosz, lt, de, fr)

Orchestral 
Symphony, for large orchestra (no.1, 1979)

Liberatio, for 12 wind instruments (3fl-3ob-3cor-3tn), cymbals and 4 (vn-vl-vc-cb) strings (1989)

Opus lugubre, for chamber orchestra (1991)

Metabole, for chamber orchestra (strings-2 oboes-harpsichord, 1992)

Sinfonia col triangolo, for chamber orchestra (1996)

Melody in the Garden of Olives (Melodija Alyvų sode), for large orchestra (2000/2001)

Symphony No. 2, for large orchestra (2001)

La barca, for large orchestra (2005)

riverbank-river-symphony (krantas upė simfonija), for large orchestra (symphony no. 4, 2007)

Was There a Butterfly? for chamber orchestra (2013)

Chamber 
Open the Gate of Oblivion (Atverk užmaršties vartus), string quartet no. 2 (1980)

The Road to Silence (Ėjimas į tylą), for organ (1980)

June Music 1981 (1981-ųjų birželio muzika), for violin and cello (1981)

Interludium, for flute, cello and organ (1983)

Vilnius-Divertimento, for flute, 2 recorders, guitar, harpsichord, tambourine and string quartet (1984)

Aštuonstygė / The Eight-string, for violin and viola (1986)

Vijoklis / Climber (Twiner), for two pianos(1988)

Poem of Vincas Mykolaitis Putinas (Vinco Mykolaičio Putino eilėraštis), for piano and soprano (1990)

Mozartsommer 1991, for flute, violin, viola and harpsichord / piano (1991)

The Drawing for a String Quartet and the Returning Winter (Piešinys styginių kvartetui ir sugrįžtančiai žiemai), string quartet no. 3 (1991)

Monogramme, for 3 percussion players (1992)

Hoquetus, for viola, cello and double bass (1993)

Beads (Vėrinys), for several melodic instruments or voices and for one or more percussion players (1995)

Gesang, for alto, tenor, bass, oboe and organ (1997, text by Rainer Maria Rilke, de)

Winterserenade, for flute, violin and viola (1997)

Autumn Ritornello. Hommage à Frédéric (Rudens riturnelė), for violin, viola, cello and piano (1999)

Sonnet à l'Amour, for tenor and guitar (1999, text by Oscar Milosz, fr)

Sonnet à l'Amour, version for voice and piano (1999/2017)

Melody in the Garden of Olives (Melodija Alyvų sode), for trumpet and two string quartets (2000)

Drappeggio, string quartet no. 4 (2004)

Le linee e i contorni, for flute, clarinet, violin and cello (2006)

Pas de deux, for mezzo-soprano and cello (2006, text by Jacques Prévert, fr)

Heliography, for soprano, viola, cello and persian drums – tombak and frame drum (2015, texts by Edmundas Gedgaudas, Vaidotas Daunys, O.Narbutaitė, en)

In the Emptiness (Tuštumoje), for piano (2016)

Labyrinth (Labirintas), for soprano and flute (2017, texts by Ingeborg Bachmann and Jorge Luis Borges, de, en)

just strings and a light wind above them, for string quartet (2017)

Choral 
Night Cantata (Nakties kantata), for vocal ensemble or chamber choir (1978, text by Antanas A. Jonynas, lt)

When the last Day of Peace comes (Kai ateina paskutinė taikos diena), for female choir, flute, viola and harpsichord (1982, text by Arvydas Ambrasas, lt)

Summertime (Vasara), for children or female choir (1991, text by O.Narbutaitė, lt)

Summertime (Vasara), version for mixed choir

Epitaph (Epitafija), for 4 voices or chamber choir, 2 recorders, guitar (harpsichord), hand bell, claves, (1993, text by Rainer Maria Rilke, de)

Lapides, flores, nomina et sidera, All Souls' Day chanting for choir, piccolo flute, trumpet, trombone and drum (2008, text: from Psalms, Litany of All Saints, other liturgical texts, O.Narbutaitė, lat)

Cantio vespertina, a separate part of the All Souls' Day chanting project for several chamber choirs and several piccolo flutes (2008, text: Requiem aeternam)

Music for Children 
Songs for a children’s choir (more than twenty songs for different age groups, 1972-1999)

Three Pieces for Two Little Pianists, for piano four-hands (1975)

A Snail and a Grasshopper in the Evening Sunlight (Sraigė ir žiogas vakaro saulės šviesoj), for piano four-hands (1986)

A Canon of Sea Pebbles (Jūros akmenėlių kanonas), for piano four-hands (1986)

Music for Drama Theatre 
Post (Rabindranath Tagore), Vilnius puppet theatre „Lėlė“ (director Rimas Driežis, 1987, later realized as a radio theatre at LRT)

The Oedipus Myth (Sophocles, Euripides, Aeschylus), Lithuanian National Drama Theatre (director Gintaras Varnas, 2016)

Recordings 
 Centones meae urbi, Vilnius Recording Studio VSCD-063 (2000)
 Autumn Ritornello, Finlandia Records, 0927-42996-2 (2002)
 June Music,  Finlandia Records, 0927-43437-2 (2002)
 Gate of Oblivion, Finlandia Records, 0927-43072-2 (2002)
 Symphony No.2, Finlandia Records, 0927-49597-2 (2003)
 Tres Dei Matris Symphoniae, Naxos, 8.572295 (2011)
 No yesterday, no tomorrow, Naxos, 8.573618 (2017)
 Onutė Narbutaitė. Music for String Quartet, NoBusiness Records, NBCD-CC2 (2020)
 Heliografija / Heliography, Mama Studios CD-05 (2021)
 In the Emptiness, digital single, MICL EA 001 (2017)

Onutė Narbutaitė’s compositions can be found on the several dozen CDs, released in Lithuania and abroad, amongst them VĖL: Lithuanian Chamber Music 1991-2001, Guild, GMCD 7283 (2004) and albums by the Ostrobothnian Chamber Orchestra: Stimmen: BalticWorks for String Orchestra, Finlandia Records, 4509-97892-2 (1995), Lighthouse, Finlandia Records, 3984-29718-2 (2000), Dedicated to, Alba records, ABCD 414 (2017).

References

1956 births
Living people
Lithuanian classical composers
Recipients of the Lithuanian National Prize
Musicians from Vilnius
Women classical composers
20th-century classical composers
21st-century classical composers
20th-century women composers
21st-century women composers
NoBusiness Records artists